The Allen County Public Library (ACPL) is a public library system located in Fort Wayne, Allen County, Indiana, United States. Founded in 1895 as the Fort Wayne Public Library, the library served residents with 3,606 books out of a single room in City Hall. Today the library system includes a main library and 13 branch libraries in Fort Wayne and throughout the county. The  Main Library Branch in downtown Fort Wayne is home to the Fred J. Reynolds Historical Genealogy Department which holds the largest public genealogy collection in the United States.

Timeline
1895 – Library opened in City Hall on January 28 with 3,606 volumes.
1898 – Library Board purchased the Brackenridge Home at Wayne Street and Webster Street for $14,000.
1904 – Carnegie-funded library building opened.
1923 – Service to county residents began. Fort Wayne Public Library became Public Library of Fort Wayne and Allen County.
1944 – Main Library expansion began with purchase of Hollywood Building on Washington Boulevard to house administrative offices.
1952 – Young Adult Department opened in basement of main library, the first such department in the country.
1968 –  building at Wayne and Webster Streets was dedicated August 21, 1968.
1977 – Construction of the new addition to the Main Library began.
1980 – Public Library of Fort Wayne and Allen County officially became Allen County Public Library by an act of the state legislature on January 1.
1985 – Estimated 5,500 people ate 2,731 pizzas during the system's 90th birthday celebration.
1997 – Library Board and staff began system-wide space needs analysis for all library facilities.
2001 – Allen County taxpayers approved bond financing of the $84 million library expansion project.
2007 – Renovation and expansion of Main Library nears completion. Grand opening was held on January 27, 2007, with Randall T. Shepard, Chief Justice of the Indiana Supreme Court, among the speakers.
2022 - The library eliminates fines for children 17 and younger.

Genealogy
The Fred J. Reynolds Historical Genealogy Department, located in the Main Library, is the largest public genealogy department in North America, home to more than 350,000 printed volumes and 513,000 items of microfilm and microfiche. Only the Family History Library in Salt Lake City, a private institution, is larger. Allen County Public Library is also a partner of WeRelate, a collaborative online genealogy database currently providing access to over one million records and two million person pages. The website also provides the largest documented place wiki available.

Branches
The Main Library and nine of the Allen County Public Library's 13 branches are located in Fort Wayne. Four branches are located in municipalities within Allen County (the name of the communities these four branches are located in is indicated next to each library's name).

 Aboite Branch
 Dupont Branch
 Georgetown Branch
 Grabill Branch (Grabill)
 Hessen Cassel Branch
 Little Turtle Branch
 Monroeville Branch (Monroeville)

 New Haven Branch (New Haven)
 Pontiac Branch
 Shawnee Branch
 Tecumseh Branch
 Waynedale Branch
 Woodburn Branch (Woodburn)

Facilities
The Main Library has five public meeting rooms that accommodate from six to 500 people. These rooms are available for use by the community for meetings and events. In addition, the building has six small group study rooms, a computer training room, and a theater that seats 230. Library branches also have meeting rooms and study rooms. The Main Library and the Georgetown branch have Maker Labs.

Access Fort Wayne
Access Fort Wayne (AFW) is a Public-access television cable TV station which provides a variety of unique services for the library. AFW originates three Public-access television channels from the Main Library. Access 1 is channel 25 on Verizon and 55 on Comcast. Access 2 is channel 27 on Verizon and 57 on Comcast. Government-access television (GATV), City TV is channel 28 on Verizon and 58 on Comcast. The channels can only be viewed on Comcast and Verizon inside of Allen County. AFW is a full production facility with two TV studios and editing facilities.

Audio Reading Service
Founded in 1979 as the Northeast Indiana Radio Reading Service (NEIRRS), the Audio Reading Service is a radio reading service for people who have visual, physical, learning, or language challenges to reading standard printed materials because of blindness, low-vision, a literacy issue, language barrier, or a physical condition. The service is for people with macular degeneration, diabetic retinopathy, arthritis, stroke, Parkinson's disease, and other conditions that affect reading traditional print. Under the leadership of library staff, volunteers read local news, grocery ads, cultural events, obituaries, and other features from area newspapers, plus nearly 80 magazines and other publications.

Previously transmitted on an SCA broadcast, the Audio Reading Service can be heard on the HD Radio station 89.1 FM HD3, broadcast from Fort Wayne. HD Radios are loaned out at no cost by the library. In addition, the service is available via podcast, live web streaming, the Sero mobile app, and TuneIn; as a secondary audio program (SAP-French) on PBS 39.4; and system-wide at select area healthcare facilities.

The Audio Reading Service broadcasts 24 hours a day, seven days a week, and reaches an estimated 80,000 individuals. It became a part of the Allen County Public Library in 2004 and changed its name to Audio Reading Service in 2015. It is a member of the International Association of Audio Information Services (IAAIS).

WELT 95.7 FM
WELT-LP is a non-commercial radio station, produced and delivered by members of the Fort Wayne community. From the studios at the downtown branch of the Allen County Public Library, WELT-LP's volunteers and staff promote programs with news about politics and community issues, plus music and entertainment performed by local, regional, and national artists in Fort Wayne venues.

See also
 List of largest libraries in the United States

Notes

References

External links

 
 The Genealogy Center of the Allen County Public Library
 Allen County Public Library at FamilySearch Research Wiki for genealogists

Government agencies established in 1895
Education in Allen County, Indiana
Library buildings completed in 1904
Carnegie libraries in Indiana
Genealogical libraries in the United States
Education in Fort Wayne, Indiana
Tourist attractions in Fort Wayne, Indiana
1895 establishments in Indiana
County library systems in Indiana